Bertram Roe "Dutch" Lerchen (April 4, 1889 – January 7, 1962) was a shortstop who played briefly for the Boston Red Sox during the  season. He was born in  Detroit, Michigan. His cousin, George Lerchen, played for Detroit and Cincinnati from 1952 to 1953.

In a six-game career, Lerchen went hitless in 15 at-bats. He received a walk and scored a run. In six appearances at shortstop, he collected nine outs with four assists and made a double play while committing one error in 14 chances for a .929 fielding percentage.

Lerchen died in his hometown of Detroit, Michigan, at age 72.

See also
1910 Boston Red Sox season

External links

1889 births
1962 deaths
Major League Baseball shortstops
Boston Red Sox players
Sacramento Sacts players
Baseball players from Detroit